Christian Adolf I, Duke of Schleswig-Holstein-Sonderburg-Franzhagen (3 June 1641 – 2 January 1702) was a German nobleman and Duke of Schleswig-Holstein-Sonderburg-Franzhagen.

Early life
He was the second son of Duke Johann Christian of Schleswig-Holstein-Sonderburg  and his wife, and Countess Anna of Oldenburg-Delmenhorst.

Biography
When he was 8 years old, his older brother, John Frederick, died, making him heir to his father's estate. On his father's death in 1653, he inherited his father's small duchy, only for it to go bankrupt in 1667 and be returned to the Danish Crown.

In 1676, he married Eleonore Charlotte of Saxony-Lauenburg, granddaughter of Francis II, Duke of Saxe-Lauenburg. Christian Adolf obtained the estate Franzhagen from the marriage, and from here he started the brief Schleswig-Holstein-Sonderburg-Franzhagen line. The couple had three sons:

 Christian Leopold, Duke of Schleswig-Holstein-Sonderburg-Franzhagen (25 August 1678 – 13 July 1707)
 Louis Charles, Duke of Schleswig-Holstein-Sonderburg-Franzhagen (4 June 1684 – 11 October 1708) — his son, Christian Adolf II, inherited the lands as a small child and was the last to hold the title.
 John Francis (30 July 1685 – 22 January 1687)

He died on 2 January 1702 in Hamburg, and his line would end with the death of his grandson Christian Adolf II.

References 

House of Oldenburg in Schleswig-Holstein
1641 births
1702 deaths
Dukes of Germany
17th-century German people